Ikaeria serusiauxii is a species of crustose lichen in the family Teloschistaceae. It is found in the Madeira Archipelago and Canary Islands (Macaronesia), as well as in coastal regions of Algarve and Estremadura in mainland Portugal, where it grows on twigs and branches of trees and shrubs. It was described as a new species in 2020 by lichenologist Harrie Sipman. Here it was growing on fallen pine trees. The specific epithet honours Belgian lichenologist Emmanuël Sérusiaux, "who contributed significantly to the exploration of the lichen diversity of Macaronesia".

Molecular phylogenetic analysis showed its close relationship to the Canary Island endemic Ikaeria aurantiellina, and so it was placed in Ikaeria, a genus circumscribed in 2017.

References

Teloschistales
Lichen species
Lichens described in 2020
Lichens of Europe
Lichens of Macaronesia
Taxa named by Harrie Sipman